Oehri is a surname. Notable people with the surname include:

Egon Oehri (born 1940), Liechtensteiner middle-distance runner
Ralf Oehri (born 1976), Liechtensteiner footballer
Yves Oehri (born 1987), Liechtensteiner footballer

See also 
Oeri